"Atta Way To Go" is a song written and recorded by American country music singer Don Williams. It was in November 1973 as the first single from the album Don Williams Volume Two. The single would reach number thirteen on the Billboard hot country chart. The track was produced by Allen Reynolds, who also produced Williams' previous top 20 chart hits.

A song from Don Williams Volume One called "I Recall A Gypsy Woman" written by Williams, along with Allen Reynolds and Bob McDill, was the b-side for the single.

Many of Williams' best known songs would be written by other composers (including Bob McDill, Allen Reynolds and Al Turney) and this single release was notable in that it was one of the few of Williams' self-penned tunes to be a charting single.

"Atta Way to Go" is considered one of the early hits that helped establish the Don Williams sound that made him a success throughout the 1970s.

Chart performance

References 

1973 singles
Don Williams songs
1973 songs
Songs written by Don Williams
Song recordings produced by Allen Reynolds